Richard Veitch (born May 7, 1951) is an American comics artist and writer who has worked in mainstream, underground, and alternative comics.

Biography
Rick Veitch is a native of the small town of Bellows Falls, Vermont. One of six children, he was raised Catholic. One of his elder brothers was the writer Tom Veitch, his first collaborator in comics. In an interview, Veitch recalled visiting the [WPA] muralist Stephan J.Belaski to ask his advice on becoming an artist. "He just said, 'Don't do it, kid.'" Winning honorable mention in a "draw a monster" contest hosted by Ed "Big Daddy" Roth, for DRAG Cartoons when he was in seventh grade reassured him that he was on the right path.

Today, Veitch lives in West Townshend, Vermont with his wife Cindy. His sons Ezra Veitch and Kirby Veitch are also artists, contributing to Eureka Comics.

Career

Early career
While still in high school, Veitch and his brother Tom created the comic strip Crazymouse, which ran regularly in The Vermont Cynic. He made his professional debut in 1972, illustrating the underground comix horror parody Two-Fisted Zombies published by Last Gasp and written by Tom. This one-shot was excerpted in Mark James Estren's 1974 study, A History of Underground Comix. According to Veitch, it also proved to be his ticket to admission to The Kubert School.

Veitch enrolled in the Kubert School in 1976,. Studying under veteran cartoonists Joe Kubert, Ric Estrada and Dick Giordano, he was part of the school's first graduating class in 1978, along with his future long-time collaborators Stephen R. Bissette and John Totleben. While still at school Veitch began his professional career in mainstream comics, contributing over a dozen short stories to DC’s combat title, Our Army at War. 

Out of school, Veitch contributed to Heavy Metal.  next major project was an adaptation of the Steven Spielberg film 1941 with Bissette.

During the 1980s, Veitch became known as a distinctive fantasy artist and writer for Marvel's Epic Comics line, for which he created three graphic novels, Abraxas and the Earthman serialized in Epic Illustrated; Heartburst published as a standalone graphic novel; and The One. 

During this period Veitch contributed numerous short comics to Epic Illustrated. He also worked with Alan Moore on Miracleman, published by Eclipse Comics. He illustrated the story that graphically depicted the birth of the superhero's child  in Miracleman #9 (July 1986). With Moore and Bissette, Veitch collaborated on the original version of The Mirror of Love, published in an 1988 anthology by AARGH (Artists Against Rampant Government Homophobia). Moore later revised the text and published it with new illustrations by José Villarrubia.

The One

Originally published as a six-issue comic book limited series, The One was an ambitious and bizarre fantasy-adventure involving monstrous superheroes, the Cold War, and spiritual evolution. Published between 1985 and 1986, The One presaged both Alan Moore's The Watchmen (1986-1987) and Frank Miller's The Dark Knight Returns (1986) in its revisionist approach to superheroics. As Moore would later write: "The One ... is a kind of landmark; a pulling together of obsessions and ingenious storytelling ideas into a coherent whole ... Its revisionist superheroics, while conceived at roughly the same time, predate Watchmen and Dark Knight in terms of publication, as does its packaging. Its political and humanist preoccupations were voiced before such sentiments became chic. Its deranged, culture-conscious humor offers an alternative and an antidote to today's rather gloomy trend of pessimistic, post-modern ultra-humans... Whatever iit is that the comic books of the 1980s turn out to be remembered for, The One was right there in the thick of it, carving out a niche in the mainstream for dangerous ideas long before dangerous ideas became box-office certainties."

Swamp Thing
Veitch's highest-profile title in the 1980s was DC Comics' Swamp Thing. His friends Totleben and Bissette had both illustrated the series since Alan Moore took over as writer. Veitch joined the team for issue #37 (cover dated June 1985), in which Moore's popular character John Constantine was introduced, and appeared regularly after issue #50. 

When Moore left the Swamp Thing series after issue #64, Veitch took over as writer, dividing art duties with Alfredo Alcala. His Swamp Thing stories took a similar approach to Moore's, combining horror-fantasy, ecological concerns, and an encyclopedic knowledge of DC Comics fantasy characters; he gradually turned his attention from the DC Universe to history and mythology. Veitch concocted a plot device -- a mystical piece of amber called The Claw of Aelkhund that gives him the power of time travel. This allowed Veitch to introduce his hero to a variety of legendary figures, from Jonah Hex, Bat Lash, and Tomahawk, to Sgt. Rock and Etrigan the Demon. While thrilling to many readers, this approach ultimately hit a bump that derailed the series.

Personally inclined towards metaphysics, Veitch submitted a script for issue #88 titled "Morning of the Magician" that moved DC to censorship. Set in Jerusalem, the principal characters include three evil Magi, several demons, the Holy Grail, Mother Mary, Joseph of Arimathea, and Mary Magdalene, here imagined as an active prostitute whose clients include the DC Silver Age hero Golden Gladiator. At the climax of the story, Swamp Thing meets Jesus Christ. 

Although DC initially had approved Veitch's initial script for "Morning of the Magician," the story was scrapped by DC President, Jenette Kahn, who deemed it too inflammatory. "The subject was handled with integrity and respect," she wrote. "but we believe that the story concept itself would be offensive to many of our readers." When the story was cancelled at the last minute, Veitch quit and vowed never to work for DC until the story saw print. The story arc has never been published.

The King Hell Heroica
After leaving DC, Veitch turned to the alternative comics field, where the success of the Teenage Mutant Ninja Turtles (TMNT) had provided the impetus for a black-and-white independent comics boom. After doing a Teenage Mutant Ninja Turtles storyline for Mirage Studios, "The River", he began creating his own titles again, published by the Mirage spin-off Tundra Publishing. Tundra was edited by TMNT creators Kevin Eastman and Peter Laird. Another friend Dave Sim, had found success publishing his own comics featuring Cerebus the Aardvark.  Veitch decided to follow suit, creating his own publishing imprint, King Hell Press. 

Operating without the editorial restraint he encountered at mainstream publishers, Veitch used his new imprint to published a series of graphic novels. The first of these was Brat Pack (1990-91), a dark satire on superhero sidekicks. A precursor to The Boys,  Brat Pack was the subject of a 400-page work of cultural analysis. 

Veitch followed Brat Pack with The Maximortal (1992), a phantasmagoric riff on Superman. He returned to the latter character with a new series inaugurated in 2017, Boy Maximortal. The series has been called his masterpiece. In a 2020 interview, Veitch calls Maximortal "kind of the illegitimate love child of S. Clay Wilson and Curt Swan.". Veitch has since reprinted these graphic novels along with other revisionist works under the collective title, The King Hell Heroica.

Rare Bit Fiends
Also for King Hell Press, Veitch created a series of strips centered on dreams titled Roarin' Rick's Rare Bit Fiends, a reference to Winsor McCay's classic newspaper comic, Dream of the Rarebit Fiend. The series first appeared as backup features in other comics. In 1994 King Hell inaugurated a Rare Bit Fiends comic series, with contributions by Neil Gaiman, Dave Sim, Don Simpson, Moebius, Paul Pope, and others. The original series also reproduced dream comics submitted by readers. King Hell published 21 issues of Rare Bit Fiends. The trade paperback reprint editions, collected in volumes, also include essays by Veitch speculating on the nature of dreaming. In 2016, Veitch launched Sun Comics to publish new issues of Maximortal and Rare Bit Fiends.  

Dave Sim paid homage to Veitch's fascination with dreams in his Cerebus comic. In the story arc Guys, Veitch (here named "Roaring Rick") appears to Cerebus in a dream to deliver a surreal monologue on the nature of dreams, lucid dreaming, and kindred matters.

The New Millennium
During the 1990s, Veitch became interested in the Internet as an alternative to traditional comics distribution. In 1998, with Steve Conley, he created the "online convention" site Comicon.com, a combination message board, news portal, and web host for comics creators. Sold to Dynamic Forces in 2012, Comicon.com is remains a vital site, which its editors liken to a perpetual comic book convention.

In the early 2000s, Veitch became a regular artist on Moore's America's Best Comics line published by Wildstorm, co-creating and then illustrating the graphically innovative "Greyshirt" serial. Debuting in Tomorrow Stories, and later spun off as an independent series, Greyshirt was an homage to Spirit, created by Will Eisner.

When Wildstorm was sold, both Veitch and Moore found themselves working indirectly for DC again, despite both having long-standing conflicts with the publisher. Reconciling with the company, Veitch scripted story arc for DC's relaunch of Aquaman (2003), and a mini-series reimagining DC-owned Charlton Comics character The Question as a self-trained urban shaman. 

In 2006, Vertigo published his 352-page graphic novel, Can't Get No, a psychedelic road narrative about a failed businessman finding himself after the World Trade Center attacks. Eschewing dialogue, the novel juxtaposes Veitch's art with stream-of-consciousness free verse poetry loosely relating to plot developments. On the tenth anniversary of the destruction of the World Trade Center, he wrote and penciled on The Big Lie, a comic book in which the protagonist – a physicist widowed on September 11, 2001 – travels back in time to attempt to save her husband. The book takes the position that the towers' destruction was a controlled demolition. Inking on The Big Lie was by Gary Erskine, who had collaborated earlier with Veitch on the satirical comic Army@Love (Vertigo, 2007–2009).

Recent Work

In 2013, Veitch teamed up with Steve Conley, the creator of Astounding Space Thrills, The Middle Age, and other webcomics to found Eureka Comics, specializing in creating comics for learning and literacy. Clients include PBS, Wired, Vermont Folklife Center, University of Quebec, the University of Vermont, and the International Monetary Fund. For McGraw Hill Education, Eureka Comics produced The Outliers, a three book series, pioneering the use of modern graphic novel storytelling techniques to teach math to middle schoolers.

In 2016, Veitch launched Sun Comics, utilizing print-on-demand publishing to release new issues of Maximortal and Rare Bit Fiends.  He also began a new series, Panel Vision.  Titles so far include the Eisner-nominated Include Spotted Stone (nominated for an Eisner Award), Otzi, Redemption, Super Catchy and Tombstone Hand.  

In 2020 Veitch was named Vermont’s official Cartoonist Laureate for his "singular career that includes groundbreaking genre work for the big superhero companies, his own creator-owned graphic novels, educational comics, and explorations into the subconscious." He is the fourth artists to hold that honor, following James Kochalka, Ed Koren, and Alison Bechdel.

Bibliography

Aardvark-Vanaheim
 Cerebus #126, 137, 180–182 (writer/artist) (1989–1994)

Awesome Comics
 Supreme #49–51, 52a, 52b, 54, 56 (1997–1998)
 Supreme: The Return #3–6 (1999–2000)

Clifford Neal
 Dr. Wirtham's Comix & Stories #2 (1976)

DC Comics
 
 9-11: The World's Finest Comic Book Writers & Artists Tell Stories to Remember, Volume Two (writer) (2002) 
 Aquaman vol. 6 #1–12 (writer) (2003–2004)
 Aquaman: The Waterbearer collected edition 
 Aquaman Secret Files and Origins 2003 #1 (writer) (2003) 
 DC Comics Presents #85 (Superman and Swamp Thing), #97 (Superman and the Phantom Zone criminals) (penciller) (1985–1986)
 DC Special Series #13 (writer/artist) (1978) 
 G.I. Combat #218 (inker) (1980) 
 JLA #77 (writer) (2003) 
 JLA/JSA Secret Files and Origins #1 (writer) (2003) 
 Jonah Hex #53–54 (penciller) (1981) 
 Mystery in Space #117 (penciller) (1981) 
 Question vol. 2 #1–6  (writer) (2005)
 Saga of the Swamp Thing #31, 37 (penciller) (1984–1985)
 Secret Origins vol. 2 #23 (writer) (1988) 
 Sgt. Rock #311, 316, 320–321, 329–330, 332–335, 338–339, 347, 355–356 (artist); #320, 330, 332–333 (writer/artist) (1977–1981)
 Swamp Thing vol. 2 #50–52, 54–59, 61, 63–64 (penciller); #62, 65–76, 79–82, Annual #3 (writer/penciller); #83–87 (writer) (1986–1989)
 Swamp Thing: Regenesis collected edition 
 Swamp Thing: Spontaneous Generation collected edition 
 Swamp Thing: Infernal Triangles collected edition 
 Who's Who: The Definitive Directory of the DC Universe #18 (Phantom Zone entry) (artist) (1986)

America's Best Comics
 ABC: A-Z, Greyshirt and Cobweb #1 (writer/artist) (2006) 
 ABC: A-Z, Top 10 and Teams #1 (artist) (2006) 
 Greyshirt: Indigo Sunset #1–6 (writer/artist) (2001–2002)
 collected edition  
 Tomorrow Stories #1–12 (artist) (1999–2002) 
 Tomorrow Stories Special #1–2 (artist) (2006)

Vertigo
 Army@Love #1–12 (writer/penciller) (2007–2008)
 Army@Love Vol. 1: The Hot Zone Club collected edition 
 Army@Love Vol. 2: Generation Pwned collected edition 
 Army@Love vol. 2 #1–6 (writer/penciller) (2008–2009)
 Can't Get No graphic novel (writer/artist) (2006)  
 Unknown Soldier vol. 4 #21 (artist) (2010)

Eclipse Comics
 Bedlam #1–2 (writer/artist) (1985)
 Miracleman #9–10 (artist) (1986)
 Scout #10 (one page) (1986)

HM Communications
 1941, the Illustrated Story graphic novel (artist) (1979)  
 Heavy Metal #v3 #1, 9; #v4 #4–5, 8–9, 11; #v7 #3 (writer/artist) (1979–1983)

Image Comics
 1963 #1, 3, 5–6 (artist) (1993)
 The Big Lie #1 (2011)

King Hell Press
 Abraxas and the Earthman graphic novel (writer/artist) (2006) 
 Bratpack #1–5 (writer/artist) (1990–1991)
 collected edition 
 Bratpack / Maximortal Super Special #1–2 (writer/artist) (1996–1997)
 The Dream Art of Rick Veitch 
 Volume 1: Rabid Eye graphic novel (writer/artist) (1996) 
 Volume 2: Pocket Universe graphic novel (writer/artist) (1996) 
 Volume 3: Crypto Zoo graphic novel (writer/artist) (2004) 
 The Maximortal #1–7 (writer/artist) (1992–1993)
 collected edition 
 The One: The Last Word In Superheroics graphic novel (writer/artist) (2003) 
 Roarin' Rick's Rare Bit Fiends #1–21 (writer/artist) (1994–1996)
 Shiny Beasts graphic novel (writer/artist) (2007)

Kitchen Sink Press
 50's Funnies #1 (1980)

Last Gasp
 Two-Fisted Zombies #1 (1973) (writer/artist) (first published work)

Marvel Comics
 Amazing Adventure #1 (artist) (1988) 
 Captain America vol. 3 #50 (penciller) (2002)
 Epic Illustrated #1 (colorist), #2 (writer), #4–6, 8, 10–17, 19, 25, 28–29 (writer/artist), #34 (artist) (1980–1986)
 Marvel Graphic Novel #10 "Heartburst" (writer/artist) (1984)   
 Marvel Preview #18 (inker) (1979)
 Marvel Super Special #16 (letterer) (1980) 
 The One #1–6  (writer/artist) (1985–1986) 
 Timespirits #4 (artist) (1985) 
 What If: Daredevil #1 (writer) (2006)

Maximum Press
 Supreme #43–48 (artist) (1996–1997)

Mirage Studios
 Teenage Mutant Ninja Turtles #24–26, 30 (writer/artist) (1989–1990)

Spiderbaby Grafix & Publications
 Taboo #3 (1989)

References

External links

 

 Rick Veitch at Mike's Amazing World of Comics
 Rick Veitch at the Unofficial Handbook of Marvel Comics Creators
 Army@Love by Veitch and Erskine at The Daily Cross Hatch (March 28, 2007)

1951 births
American comics artists
American comics writers
American Roman Catholics
Artists from Vermont
Comic book letterers
Comic book publishers (people)
Comics colorists
Living people
People from Bellows Falls, Vermont
The Kubert School alumni
Underground cartoonists
Writers from Vermont